IOH may mean:

I/O Hub, an Intel chipset architecture.
Indiana Orthopaedic Hospital
Initial Orthostatic Hypotension, a medical condition
Improved Order of Heptasophs, a fraternal organization
Infinity on High, a 2007 album by Fall Out Boy
 United States Army Institute of Heraldry